Henry Johnson Brodhead Cummings (May 21, 1831 – April 16, 1909) was an American lawyer, Civil War officer, editor and publisher, and one-term Republican congressman from Iowa's 7th Congressional District.

Early life 
Born in Newton, New Jersey, Cummings attended public schools in Muncy, Pennsylvania.

Career 
He was editor of a newspaper in Schuylkill County, Pennsylvania, in 1850, studied law and was admitted to the bar in 1855. He moved to Winterset, Iowa, in 1856; he served as prosecuting attorney for Madison County from 1856 to 1858.

In July 1861, Cummings enlisted in the Union Army, and was made captain of Company F of the 4th Iowa Volunteer Infantry Regiment. He accepted the commission of colonel in the 39th Iowa Volunteer Infantry Regiment on September 12, 1862, and he was honorably discharged on December 22, 1864. Afterward, he became editor and proprietor of the Winterset Madisonian.

In 1876 he was elected as a Republican to succeed John A. Kasson as the representative of Iowa's 7th Congressional District in the U. S. House of Representatives. He served in the 45th United States Congress, from 1877 to 1879. Running for re-election in 1879, he was defeated in the general election by Greenback Party candidate Edward H. Gillette.

Death 
Cummings died in Winterset on April 16, 1909, and was interred in Winterset Cemetery.

External links
 Retrieved on 2008-02-14

1831 births
1909 deaths
People from Newton, New Jersey
District attorneys in Iowa
Pennsylvania lawyers
19th-century American newspaper editors
Union Army officers
People from Schuylkill County, Pennsylvania
People of Iowa in the American Civil War
People from Winterset, Iowa
Republican Party members of the United States House of Representatives from Iowa
19th-century American politicians
Journalists from Pennsylvania
Military personnel from Pennsylvania
Military personnel from New Jersey